Lamela is a residential building in Zenica, Bosnia and Herzegovina. It is the tallest building in Zenica, with a height of 101.09 m.

References

Buildings and structures in Zenica
Residential buildings in Bosnia and Herzegovina